or the West Temple was one of the two large Buddhist temples established in Kyoto, Japan.

History
Sai-ji was founded in the early Heian period.  The temple dates from 796, two years after the capital moved to Heian-kyō.  Sai-ji was established together with the other temple, Tō-ji (the East Temple). Each occupied a square site of approximately 300 m by 300 m situated symmetrically on both sides of the Suzaku Avenue (Suzaku-ōji, present-day Senbon-dōri), just north of the great Rashōmon gate along the southern edge of the city. While Tō-ji has survived (albeit rebuilt) into modern times, Sai-ji was burnt in 990 and 1233, then abandoned and never rebuilt.

The two temples (together with Shingon-in in the imperial palace) were the only Buddhist institutions allowed in the capital at the time it was established. This policy was introduced by Emperor Kanmu in order to curb the political influence the large Buddhist institutions in Heijō-kyō (present-day Nara) had acquired during the 8th century.

Now a small park in Minami-ku, Kyoto, commemorates the temple at the site, a little west and north of the intersection of Kujō street and Senbon street.

See also
 List of Buddhist temples in Kyoto
 For an explanation of terms concerning Japanese Buddhism, Japanese Buddhist art, and Japanese Buddhist temple architecture, see the Glossary of Japanese Buddhism.

Notes

References
 Ponsonby-Fane, Richard Arthur Brabazon. (1956). Kyoto: The Old Capital of Japan, 794-1869. Kyoto: The Ponsonby Memorial Society.

External links
 

Buddhist temples in Kyoto
Buddhist archaeological sites in Japan
Historic Sites of Japan
Buddhism in the Heian period
https://mainichi.jp/english/articles/20191026/p2a/00m/0na/018000c